The Arizona Diamondbacks farm system consists of eight Minor League Baseball affiliates across the United States and in the Dominican Republic. Six teams are independently owned, while four—two Arizona Complex League Diamondbacks teams and two Dominican Summer League Diamondbacks teams—are owned by the major league club.

The Diamondbacks have been affiliated with the Low-A Visalia Rawhide franchise of the California League since 2007, making it the longest-running active affiliation in the organization among teams not owned by the Diamondbacks. Arizona's longest affiliation was with the Missoula Osprey spanning 22 seasons from 1999 to 2020. Their newest affiliate is the Amarillo Sod Poodles of the Texas League, which became the Diamondbacks' Double-A club in 2021.

2021–present
The current structure of Minor League Baseball is the result of an overall contraction of the system beginning with the 2021 season. Class A was reduced to two levels: High-A and Low-A. Low-A was reclassified as Single-A in 2022.

1996–2020
Minor League Baseball operated with six classes from 1990 to 2020. The Class A level was subdivided for a second time with the creation of Class A-Advanced. The Rookie level consisted of domestic and foreign circuits.

References

External links 
 Major League Baseball Prospect News: Arizona Diamondbacks
 Baseball-Reference: Arizona Diamondbacks League Affiliations

Minor league affiliates